The Texas Conference was a college athletic conference in the United States that existed from 1926 to 1956. During its existence, a total of 11 different colleges in Texas, and one from New Mexico, were members.

History
The conference was created by a split within the Texas Intercollegiate Athletic Association (TIAA) between members who wanted to allow freshmen and transfers to play and schools that did not.  This fault line also separated the teachers colleges that had joined over the years and the church-sponsored schools that had been founders. In May 1925, Austin College, Howard Payne University, Simmons University (now Hardin–Simmons University), Southwestern University, and Trinity University voted to leave the TIAA, but agreed to play out the fall 1925 football season within the TIAA. Play within the Texas Conference began with the 1926 basketball season. The five founding schools of the conference were all church-supported and agreed to ally themselves "along denominational lines."

At the end of 1926, St. Edward's University joined the conference. In 1932, Trinity University left to join other former members of the TIAA in the Lone Star Conference, while Abilene Christian, Daniel Baker College, and McMurry College joined the Texas Conference at the end of the year. Trinity returned at the end of 1933, giving the conference a high of nine teams. Hardin–Simmons left the conference in December 1935, reducing the conference to eight teams. In May 1937, Texas Wesleyan University was admitted to the conference, restoring total membership to nine. St. Edward's left the conference in December 1939, when it discontinued intercollegiate athletics.

Due to World War II, Daniel Baker did not field a football team in the fall of 1942, then in February 1943 ended its basketball season early. The conference suspended athletics in the spring of 1943, although Southwestern continued to field a football team, winning the 1944 Sun Bowl and 1945 Sun Bowl, after the college football seasons of 1943 and 1944, respectively. The Texas Conference reorganized in December 1945; at that time, Trinity University again departed and Daniel Baker did not return, leaving the conference with six teams: Abilene Christian, Austin, Howard Payne, McMurry, Southwestern, and Texas Wesleyan. At the end of 1946, Hardin–Simmons rejoined the conference. In 1947, Texas Wesleyan discontinued football, requiring it to quit the conference. In December 1948, Hardin–Simmons left in order to join the Lone Star Conference; they were effectively replaced by Texas A&I (now Texas A&M University–Kingsville), who joined the conference in February 1949, again giving the conference six teams.

In the early 1950s, the conference began to have trouble holding together. Southwestern discontinued its football program after the 1950 season, causing them to be dropped from the conference in 1951. Later, Eastern New Mexico University became the only school from outside of Texas to join the conference, with participation to start in the 1954 track season. But before they could start, in December 1953, the conference was cut from six members to three. Abilene Christian announced it would leave to become an independent, Texas A&I left to join the Lone Star Conference, and Austin College, because of an eligibility feud with other members, also left to become an independent. With three remaining members—Eastern New Mexico, Howard Payne, and McMurry—the conference disbanded in May 1956.

Members

 Daniel Baker was consolidated with Howard Payne in 1952.

Membership timeline

Football champions

1926 – Simmons
1927 – 
1928 – 
1929 – 
1930 – 
1931 –  and Simmons
1932 – 
1933 – St. Edward's
1934 – 
1935 – Austin

1936 – 
1937 – 
1938 – 
1939 –  and St. Edward's
1941 – 
1942 – 
1943 – No season
1944 – No season
1945 – No season

1946 – Abilene Christian and Southwestern (TX)
1947 –  and McMurry
1948 – 
1949 – 
1950 – 
1952 – Abilene Christian
1954 – Howard Payne
1955 – McMurry

Basketball champions
1939 –

See also
 List of defunct college football conferences

References

External links
 List of Conference Football champions 1926-1954

 
Sports organizations established in 1926
Organizations disestablished in 1956